Trevor Wallace (born December 30, 1992) is an American comedian, writer, and actor from Camarillo, California. Wallace is a regular on the YouTube channel All Def Digital and has been featured on Buzzfeed, Unilad, Funny or Die, Super Deluxe, Fusion TV, Worldstar Hip Hop, and MTV2.

Early life and education
Wallace was born in Naperville, Illinois but grew up in Camarillo, California.
He graduated from San Jose State University.  During his time at San Jose State University, he was a member of the Delta Upsilon fraternity.

Comedy career
Wallace's comedy career began with making short videos for the hosting platform Vine while attending San Jose State University. He has created several viral comedy videos about the brand Zumiez that have been viewed more than fourteen million times as of 2017. He also created a comedy video about AirPods that was widely viewed. Wallace's May 2019 video about men named Kyle has furthered its appearance in memes relating the name to "angry, Monster Energy-chugging white boys". In July 2019, Wallace released a viral video satirizing drinkers of White Claw Hard Seltzer, along with a line of t-shirts that read "Ain't No Laws When You're Drinking Claws"; the beverage company responded with a cease and desist order.

As of 2018, Wallace works for All Def Digital, which is based in Los Angeles. He made regular guest appearances on the All Def comedy YouTube series, Great Taste. He also performs stand-up comedy, including at venues such as San Jose Improv, Zanies Comedy Club in Nashville, and Orpheum Theatre in Arizona. Wallace and comedian Michael Blaustein are the co-hosts of the podcast Stiff Socks, which began in 2019.

Awards and nominations

References

External links 
 

Living people
1992 births
People from Camarillo, California
Comedians from California
San Jose State University alumni